Freefield Castle was a castle, about  north of Inverurie, Aberdeenshire, Scotland, and  west of North Rayne.

Alternatively it may be known at Freefield or Treefield.

History
The Leith family were the owners of the site.  Leslie of Pitcaple killed George Leith of Freefield, starting a family feud.

Structure 
There is no longer any trace of the castle.

Castles in Great Britain and Ireland
List of castles in Scotland

References

Castles in Aberdeenshire